Roger Leroy Mason (born September 18, 1957) is an American former professional baseball player who pitched in the Major Leagues primarily in relief from 1984 to 1987, 1989, and 1991–1994.

Mason was a member of the 1984 World Series champion Detroit Tigers, and appeared in the 1993 World Series for the Philadelphia Phillies. He pitched collegiately at Saginaw Valley State University.

In November 2008, Mason was hired as the pitching coach for the Traverse City Beach Bums of the independent Frontier League.  In his initial season as coach, the Beach Bums posted the third lowest earned run average in the league.

External links

1958 births
Living people
Detroit Tigers players
San Francisco Giants players
Houston Astros players
Pittsburgh Pirates players
San Diego Padres players
Philadelphia Phillies players
New York Mets players
Major League Baseball pitchers
Baseball players from Michigan
Macon Peaches players
Lakeland Tigers players
Evansville Triplets players
Birmingham Barons players
Phoenix Giants players
Phoenix Firebirds players
Saginaw Valley State Cardinals baseball players
Saginaw Valley State Cardinals football players
Saginaw Valley State Cardinals men's basketball players
Buffalo Bisons (minor league) players
Tucson Toros players
Gulf Coast Pirates players
People from Bellaire, Michigan